Kazan Ring is a race track, built on the outskirts of Kazan, along its bypass road next with autodrome "High Mountain". The track runs counterclockwise. The first competition took place in 2011. The unofficial track record was set in test runs on a 2010 GP2 race car, the indicated time is 1:12.870.

Lap records
The official race lap records at the Kazan Ring are listed as:

References 

Sport in Kazan
Motorsport venues in Russia